The Portrait of Eleanor of Toledo and Her Son is a painting by the Italian artist Agnolo di Cosimo, known as Bronzino, finished ca. 1545. One of his most famous works, it is housed in the Uffizi Gallery of Florence, Italy and is considered one of the preeminent examples of Mannerist portraiture. The painting depicts Eleanor of Toledo, the wife of Cosimo I de' Medici, Grand Duke of Tuscany, sitting with her hand resting on the shoulder of one of her sons. This gesture, as well as the pomegranate motif on her dress, referred to her role as mother. Eleanor wears a heavily brocaded dress with black arabesques. In this pose, she is depicted as the ideal woman of the Renaissance. The painting is the first known state-commissioned portrait to include the ruler's heir. By including the child, Cosimo wished to imply that his rule would bring stability to the duchy.

The child has been variously identified as being either Eleanor's son Francesco (born 1541), Giovanni (born 1543) or Garzia (born 1547). If the subject is the latter, the portrait should be dated around 1550–53, but the date is now generally assigned to c. 1545, based on an examination of the evolution of Bronzino's style, which would suggest Giovanni.

The portrait has been called "cold", reflecting the sober formality of Eleanor's native Spanish Court, without the warmth typically expected of a portrait of mother and child. Such distancing is typical of the Mannerist school's rejection of naturalism. Conversely, Eleanor's gown of elaborate brocaded velvet, with its massed bouclé effects of gold weft loops in the style called riccio sopra riccio (loop over loop), is painstakingly replicated. The painting is perhaps an advertisement for the Florentine silk industry, which had fallen in popularity in the first difficult years of the sixteenth century and was revived in the reign of Cosimo I. The precious golden belt, decorated with jewels and beads with a tassel, may have been made by the goldsmith Benvenuto Cellini.

Clothing 

 Eleanor is depicted wearing a formal gown over a camisa or smock of linen trimmed with narrow bands of blackwork embroidery at the neck and sleeve ruffles.  Bronzino's painting captures the dimensionality of the brocaded silk velvet fabric in the gown with its loops of gold-wrapped thread and black pile arabesques against a white satin ground. Clothing made of such rich textiles was reserved for official occasions and was not typical of Eleanor's everyday wardrobe, which featured solid-coloured gowns of velvets and satins.

When Eleanor's body was exhumed in the 19th century, some concluded she had been buried in the same dress as in the portrait. An almost identical hairnet might have caused this confusion. But newer research shows that she was buried in a much simpler white satin gown over a crimson velvet bodice (and probably a matching petticoat, which has not survived). After a long and complex restoration, the original clothing has been conserved and detailed reconstructions are displayed in the Costume Gallery in the Palazzo Pitti, Florence.  The original garments are much too fragile for public display.

References

Sources
 

 
 

Eleonora
Eleanor of Toledo
1545 paintings
Eleanor of Toledo
Eleanor of Toledo
Eleanor of Toledo
Paintings by Bronzino in the Uffizi
Paintings of children